Vincent Kling may refer to:

 Vincent Kling (translator) (fl. from 1990), American scholar and translator of German literature
 Vincent Kling (architect) (1916–2013), American architect